Guillermo Riveros Conejeros (10 February 1902 – 8 October 1959) was a Chilean football defender. He was part of Chile's team at the 1928 Summer Olympics, but he did not play in any matches.

References

External links

Chilean footballers
Chile international footballers
Olympic footballers of Chile
Footballers at the 1928 Summer Olympics
1930 FIFA World Cup players
1902 births
1959 deaths
Association football defenders